The return on assets (ROA) shows the percentage of how profitable a company's assets are in generating revenue.

ROA can be computed as below:

This number tells you what the company can do with what it has, i.e. how many dollars of earnings they derive from each dollar of assets they control. It's a useful number for comparing competing companies in the same industry. The number will vary widely across different industries. Return on assets gives an indication of the capital intensity of the company, which will depend on the industry; companies that require large initial investments will generally have lower return on assets. ROAs over 5% are generally considered good.

Usage

Return on assets is one of the elements used in financial analysis using the Du Pont Identity.

See also
Return on equity (ROE)
List of business and finance abbreviations
Rate of return on a portfolio
Return on brand (ROB)
Return on capital (ROC)
Return on investment (ROI)
Weighted average return on assets (WARA)

References

External links
Return On Assets - ROA

Financial ratios
Investment indicators